The Southern Cross Group of Forest Researchers and Practitioners (the Southern Cross Group for short) is a group of individuals with experience and expertise in forestry and forest ecology, who work to foster better management of Australia's native forests.

Goals
In their 2006 report, the Southern Cross Group advocated incentives to encourage private landholders:
 to retain and foster more native trees on their land,
 to allow and stimulate these trees to reach larger sizes,
 to report the presence of endangered plants and animals on their land, and
 to provide more habitat for these endangered species.

Members
The Southern Cross Group includes:
Dr Jerry Vanclay - Professor of Sustainable Forestry, Southern Cross University
Mr David Thompson, Centre for Agricultural & Regional Economics Pty Ltd
Prof. Jeff Sayer, formerly Prince Bernhard Chair of International Nature Conservation, Utrecht University
Dr Jeff McNeely, Chief Scientist, World Conservation Union (IUCN)
Dr David Kaimowitz, Director General, Center for International Forestry Research
Mr Alex Jay, Branch President, Australian Forest Growers
Ms Anne Gibbs, Community Natural Resource Management Support Officer
Mrs Heather Crompton, past President, Institute of Foresters of Australia
Mr David Cameron, Committee Member, NSW Farmers’ Association
Dr Ian Bevege, Member, Institute of Foresters of Australia

References

External links
 A Proposal for Stewardship Support to Private Native Forest in NSW''

Nature conservation organisations based in Australia